Australidea is a genus in the family Malmideaceae. It is monospecific, containing a single species, the crustose lichen Australidea canorufescens. The genus was circumscribed by Gintaras Kantvilas, Mats Wedin, and Måns Svensson in 2021 to contain the species previously known as Lecidea canorufescens. This lichen is widespread in temperate Australia.

References

Malmideaceae
Lichen genera
Lecanorales genera
Taxa described in 2021
Taxa named by Gintaras Kantvilas